Seafire could refer to:

 Supermarine Seafire, a British naval fighter in service during WW2 and immediate post-war
 SeaFire, a James Bond novel
  Seafire (bioluminescence), Marine Bioluminescence